John or Jack Shaw may refer to:

Entertainment
 John Shaw (baritone) (1924–2003), operatic baritone
 John Shaw (photographer) (born 1944), American nature photographer
 John Shaw (painter) (born 1948), American/Canadian artist
 John Shaw (stone carver) (born 1952), of Saxby, Lincolnshire
 John Shaw (broadcaster) (1957–2013), English radio broadcaster
 John K. Shaw (born 1968), Scottish chess player
 John Shaw (actor), American actor who portrayed Mr. Huff in Diary of a Wimpy Kid: Rodrick Rules

Politics
 John Shaw (died 1690) (1617–1690), English politician
 Sir John Shaw, 1st Baronet (1615–1680), English merchant and politician
 Sir John Shaw, 3rd Baronet (c. 1679–1752), Scottish Whig politician
 John Shaw (Canadian politician) (1837–1917), Canadian politician and lawyer
 John G. Shaw (1859–1932), U.S. Representative from North Carolina
 John Valentine Wistar Shaw (1894–1982), British colonial administrator
 John Shaw (public servant) (1902–1983), New South Wales public servant
 John A. Shaw (1939-2020), U.S. government official

Religion
 John Shawe or Shaw (1608–1672), English Puritan minister
 John Shaw (bishop) (1863–1934), American Roman Catholic archbishop
 John Luis Shaw (1870–1952), Seventh-day Adventist leader
 Jerome Shaw (John Robert Shaw, born 1946), bishop of the Russian Orthodox Church Outside of Russia

Sports
 John Shaw (Kent cricketer) (1832–1912), English cricketer
 John Shaw (footballer, born 1886) (1886–1916), English footballer for Sunderland
 Jock Shaw (1912–2000), Scottish footballer for Airdrieonians and Rangers
 Jack Shaw (footballer, born 1916) (1916–1973), English footballer for Birmingham
 Jack Shaw (footballer, born 1924) (1924–2011), English footballer for Rotherham United and Sheffield Wednesday
 John Shaw (Victoria cricketer) (1931–2018), Australian cricketer
 John Shaw (rugby league) (1934–2010), rugby league footballer for Great Britain and Halifax RLFC
 John Shaw (sailor) (born 1937), Australian sailor and Olympic champion
 Jack F. Shaw (1938–2009), Western Michigan University track & cross-country coach
 John Shaw (footballer, born 1954), Scottish footballer for Bristol City and Exeter City
 John Shaw (field hockey) (born 1962), England/GB field hockey international
 John Shaw (rugby union) (born 1968), Scottish rugby union player, coach and referee
 John Shaw (hurler) (born 1982), Irish hurler

Other
 John E. Shaw, U.S. Space Force general
 John Shaw (cabinetmaker) (1745–1829), Annapolis cabinetmaker
 John Shaw (naval officer) (1773–1823), U.S. Navy captain
 John Shaw Sr. (1776–1832), English architect
 John Shaw Jr. (1803–1870), English architect
 John Cargyll Shaw (1845–1900), neurologist
 John MacKay Shaw (1897–1984), business executive, bibliophile, philanthropist, and writer
 John Malach Shaw (1931–1999), U.S. federal judge
 John James McIntosh Shaw, Scottish military surgeon
 John Shaw (oil driller), American oil driller, businessman and photographer
 John Shaw (slave trader), English slave trader and mayor of Liverpool
 Sir Jack Shaw (accountant) (John Calman Shaw, 1932–2021), Scottish banker and academic
 John Shaw, killed in the Canyon Diablo shootout in 1905, and subject of a famous postmortem photograph
 John S. Shaw, chairman of Sonat Inc., namesake of the Transocean John Shaw
 Transocean John Shaw, a 1982 semi-submersible drilling rig
 John Shaw, accomplice of English murderer Geoffrey Evans

See also
 John Shawe (disambiguation)
 John Shore (disambiguation)
 Jonathan Shaw (disambiguation)